Bahon may refer to:

 Báhoň, a village and municipality in the Pezinok District of western Slovakia
 Bahon, Haiti, an inland commune in Nord department, Haiti